Tima may refer to:

Places
Tima, Bhutan, Bhutanian town
Tima, Egypt, Egyptian city
Bayt Tima, former Palestinian village

Other
Tima (name)
Tima people
Tima language
Tima (hydrozoan), a genus of hydrozoans
Tima (moth) a synonym of the moth genus Acontia

See also